&& is a double ampersand.

&& may also refer to:

 Label value operator for Computed GOTO
 Short-circuit AND in several programming languages